Chintalapalli may refer to:

 Chintalapalli, East Godavari, a village in Andhra Pradesh, India
 Chintalapalli, Kurnool, a village in Andhra Pradesh, India